Hibbertia ulicifolia is a species of flowering plant in the family Dilleniaceae and is endemic to the south-west of Western Australia.

It was first formally described in 1863 by George Bentham who gave it the name Candollea uncinata in Flora Australiensis from specimens collected by James Drummond. In 1882, Ferdinand von Mueller changed the name to Hibbertia uncinata in his Systematic Census of Australian Plants. The specific epithet (uncinata) means "hooked", referring to the leaves.

This hibbertia grows on slopes, hills and floodplains in the Avon Wheatbelt biogeographical region of south-western Western Australia.

Conservation status
Hibbertia uncinata is classified as "not threatened" by the Western Australian Government Department of Parks and Wildlife.

See also
List of Hibbertia species

References

ulicifolia
Flora of Western Australia
Plants described in 1863
Taxa named by George Bentham